

Buildings and structures

Buildings

 1670
 Báo Quốc Pagoda, Huế, Vietnam, is built.
 Saint George Palace, Rennes, France, has its foundation stones laid.
 1671 – Weston Park, Shropshire, England, is built for Elizabeth Wilbraham.
 1672
 Buildings by Christopher Wren in England:
 Temple Bar, London rebuilt.
 Williamson Building at The Queen's College, Oxford, completed.
 Church of Monastery of Serra do Pilar in Gaia, Portugal, consecrated.
 Construction of Castillo de San Marcos at St. Augustine, Florida, designed by Ignacio Daza, begins.
 1673
 April – Badshahi Masjid in Lahore, Punjab, built for Aurangzeb, is completed.
 October 3 – Kintai Bridge in Iwakuni, Suō Province (modern-day Yamaguchi Prefecture), Japan,  is officially completed.
 St Mary-le-Bow church in London, designed by Christopher Wren, rebuilding completed.
 Monastery of San Francisco, Lima, Peru, is consecrated (completed 1774).
 Berkeley House, London, designed by Hugh May and begun in 1665, is completed.
 1675
 June – Work on the new St Paul's Cathedral in London, designed by Christopher Wren, begins.
 June 11 – Theatine Church, Munich, consecrated in form as left by Agostino Barelli.
 August 2 – Portuguese Synagogue (Amsterdam), designed by Elias Bouwman and begun in 1671, is completed.
 Bethlem Royal Hospital in London, designed by Robert Hooke.
 Briggflatts Meeting House near Sedbergh in north-west England built.
 1676
 The Royal Greenwich Observatory in London, designed by Christopher Wren is completed.
 Wren Library, Cambridge, the library of Trinity College, England, is designed by Christopher Wren (completed 1695).
 Main courtyards of Les Invalides in Paris, designed by Libéral Bruant, are completed.
 Skokloster Castle in Sweden, designed by Caspar Vogel with Jean de la Vallée and Nicodemus Tessin the Elder, is completed.
 St. Peter and St. Paul's Church, Vilnius is completed.

 1677
 The Monument to the Great Fire of London, designed by Christopher Wren and Robert Hooke is completed.
 Chapel of Emmanuel College, Cambridge, designed by Christopher Wren.
 Remodelling of Cornbury House in Oxfordshire, England, designed by Hugh May and begun about 1663, is completed.
 1679
 Chapel (Église Saint-Louis des Invalides) at Les Invalides, Paris, is completed to the design of Libéral Bruant.
 Černín Palace in Prague, designed by Francesco Caratti, is completed.
 Montagu House, Bloomsbury, London, designed by Robert Hooke, is completed.

Events
 1671: December 30 – The Académie royale d'architecture is founded by Louis XIV of France in Paris, the world's first school of architecture.

Births
 1672 – Francis Smith of Warwick, English architect (died 1738)
 1673 – Johann Friedrich Ludwig, German-born architect working in Portugal (died 1752)
 c.1673 – John James, English architect (died 1746)
 1676: June 15 – Colen Campbell, Scottish-born Georgian architect (died 1729)
 1678: March 7 – Filippo Juvarra, Sicilian-born architect (died 1736)
 1679 – Francesco Zerafa, Maltese architect (died 1758)

Deaths
 1670: October 11 – Louis Le Vau French classical architect (born 1612)
 1672: October 24 – John Webb, English architect (born 1611)
 1677: June 26 – Francesco Buonamici, Italian Baroque architect, painter and engraver (born 1596)

See also 
 Architecture timeline

References

Architecture